CNTS or cnts may refer to:

Confédération Nationale des Travailleurs Sénégalais
Carbon nanotubes